The 2022–23 Kennesaw State Owls men's basketball team represented Kennesaw State University in the 2022–23 NCAA Division I men's basketball season. The Owls, led by fourth-year head coach Amir Abdur-Rahim, play their home games at the KSU Convocation Center in Kennesaw, Georgia as members of the ASUN Conference. They finished the regular season with a 15–3 ASUN record, with a 26–8 overall record, becoming the ASUN regular season champions alongside Liberty. In the ASUN tournament, the Owls defeated Queens, Lipscomb, and Liberty to receive the conference's automatic bid to the NCAA tournament, the school's first-ever trip to the tournament.

Previous season
The Owls finished the 2021–22 season 13–18, 7–9 in ASUN play to finish in fourth place in the East Division. In the ASUN tournament, they defeated Eastern Kentucky in the first round, before falling to Jacksonville State in the quarterfinals.

Roster

Schedule and results

|-
!colspan=12 style=| Non-conference regular season

|-
!colspan=12 style=| ASUN Conference regular season

|-
!colspan=12 style=| ASUN tournament

|-
!colspan=12 style=}| NCAA tournament

Sources

References

Kennesaw State Owls men's basketball seasons
Kennesaw State Owls
Kennesaw State
Kennesaw State Owls men's basketball
Kennesaw State Owls men's basketball